From the Hut, to the Projects, to the Mansion is a concept album released by Haitian rapper Wyclef Jean, released on November 10, 2009. The album, Jean's seventh overall, is a collaboration with disc jockey DJ Drama, which tells the story of the fictional character Toussaint St. Jean, who is based on the 18th century Haitian revolutionary Toussaint L'Ouverture. The album, which was co-produced by Jean and long-term collaborator Jerry 'Wonda' Duplessis, combines elements of Hip Hop, Reggae, R&B and Folk. The album contains guest appearances from Timbaland, Eve, Cyndi Lauper and Lil' Kim, and production from The Runners.

Two singles were released from the album: "Warrior's Anthem", released on October 13, and "You Don't Wanna Go Outside", featuring Maino, released on November 3. "We Made It" and "More Bottles", featuring Timbaland were also released as instant grat downloads following the purchase of the parent album from Wyclef's official store.

Track listing

Chart performance

References

Wyclef Jean albums
2009 albums
Albums produced by Wyclef Jean
Albums produced by Jerry Duplessis
Albums produced by the Runners
Albums produced by Timbaland